Primoz Ferjan (born 10 February 1985) is a Slovenian judoka.

Achievements

See also
European Judo Championships
List of martial arts
Sport in Slovenia#Judo

References

External links
 

1985 births
Living people
Slovenian male judoka
Place of birth missing (living people)
21st-century Slovenian people